The following is a list of famous Olympians, those people of note who have lived in or around Olympia, Washington:

References

Olympia, Washington
History of Olympia, Washington

Olympia